Phayeng railway station is a proposed railway station in Imphal West district, Manipur. Its code is PHYNG. It will serve Kangchup city. The proposed station includes two platforms. The work on this rail line is expected to be finished year 2019.

References

Railway stations in Imphal East district
Lumding railway division
Proposed railway stations in India